Leonel Ferroni (born 29 January 1996) is an Argentine professional footballer who plays as a left-back for CF Intercity , on loan from Newell's Old Boys.

Career
Ferroni was moved into the first-team of Newell's Old Boys, who signed him from Malvinas Argentinas in 2002, during the 2017–18 Argentine Primera División campaign, making his professional debut under manager Juan Manuel Llop during a 2–1 victory over Chacarita Juniors on 29 October 2017. In his second appearance a week later, Ferroni received a straight red card in a fixture with Patronato. In July 2019, Ferroni was loaned to newly-promoted Primera División team Central Córdoba. His bow for the club arrived on 21 August in the Copa Argentina versus All Boys, though his league debut wouldn't come until November in a victory over Patronato. Those two appearances, which totalled ninety-five minutes, were his only two for them.

Ferroni wasn't taken into account by Central Córdoba in early January, with his loan deal eventually being terminated by the start of February. In August 2020, Independiente Rivadavia completed the loan signing of Ferroni.

Career statistics
.

References

External links

1996 births
Living people
Footballers from Rosario, Santa Fe
Argentine footballers
Association football defenders
Argentine Primera División players
Newell's Old Boys footballers
Central Córdoba de Santiago del Estero footballers
Independiente Rivadavia footballers
CF Intercity players